Ivan Kecojević (Montenegrin Cyrillic: Иван Кецојевић, born 10 April 1988) is a Montenegrin footballer who plays as a central defender.

Club career

Early career
Born in Bar, he started playing in his hometown club FK Mornar. He made his debut for the senior squad in the 2004–05 Montenegrin First League. After 2006 when Montenegro separated and formed its own league, Kecojević still played the first six months of the 2006–07 season, when, during the winter break he moved to Serbia and signed with FK Teleoptik. Teleoptik is known for being FK Partizan's satellite club, and most better players end up having good prospects of later earning a chance in Partizan's main team, or other Serbian top league clubs.

Kecojević played with Teleoptik for two and a half seasons, before getting a chance in the Serbian SuperLiga by being loaned to Čukarički. There he became a regular player making 25 league appearances that season. Unsurprisingly, in the following summer of 2010, he signed a three-year contract with another SuperLiga club, OFK Beograd.

Gaziantepspor
Kecojević signed for Gaziantepspor in August 2012 on a four-year contract. In a match against Beşiktaş, he attempted to go on the field in only briefs without any shorts on.

Zürich
On 9 January 2013, Kecojević signed for FC Zürich, after which club chairman Ancillo Canepa told journalists that "In Ivan we got an excellent, experienced player, focused one hundred percent on football." He won the 2013–14 Swiss Cup and 2015–16 Swiss Cup with Zürich. In June 2017, his contract expired.

Cádiz / Albacete
On 9 August 2017, Kecojević signed a one-year contract with Segunda División club Cádiz. On 18 August 2019, he moved to fellow league team Albacete Balompié on a three-year deal.

International career
Since 2008, he has been a regular player of the Montenegro national under-21 football team. Under coach Branko Brnović, he began appearing for the Montenegrin senior side in the 2014 World Cup qualification phase. He made his senior debut for Montenegro in a November 2012 FIFA World Cup qualification match against San Marino and has earned a total of five caps, scoring no goals. His final international appearance was an October 2013 World Cup qualification match against Moldova.

References

External links
 
 
 Ivan Kecojević Stats at Utakmica.rs

1988 births
Living people
People from Bar, Montenegro
Association football central defenders
Montenegrin footballers
Montenegro under-21 international footballers
Montenegro international footballers
FK Mornar players
FK Teleoptik players
FK Čukarički players
OFK Beograd players
Gaziantepspor footballers
FC Zürich players
Cádiz CF players
Albacete Balompié players
Montenegrin First League players
Serbian SuperLiga players
Süper Lig players
Swiss Super League players
Segunda División players
Montenegrin expatriate footballers
Expatriate footballers in Serbia
Montenegrin expatriate sportspeople in Serbia
Expatriate footballers in Turkey
Montenegrin expatriate sportspeople in Turkey
Expatriate footballers in Switzerland
Montenegrin expatriate sportspeople in Switzerland
Expatriate footballers in Spain
Montenegrin expatriate sportspeople in Spain
CF Intercity players